This is the list of winners and nominees of the César Award for Best Actor.

History

Superlatives

Winners

1970s

1980s

1990s

2000s

2010s

2020s

Multiple wins and nominations

The following individuals received two or more Best Actor awards: 

The following individuals received three or more Best Actor nominations:

One actor has the record of most consecutive nominations with 4: Gerard Depardieu (1977, 1978, 1979, 1980/ 1983, 1984, 1985, 1986/ 1988, 1989, 1990, 1991)

See also
Lumières Award for Best Actor
Magritte Award for Best Actor
European Film Award for Best Actor
Academy Award for Best Actor
BAFTA Award for Best Actor

References

External links 
  
 César Award for Best Actor at AlloCiné

Actor
 
Film awards for lead actor